Dr. Ambedkar Nagar-Mhow Assembly constituency  is one of the 230 Vidhan Sabha (Legislative Assembly) constituencies of Madhya Pradesh state in central India.

Overview 
Dr. Ambedkar Nagar-Mhow (constituency number 209) is one of the 8 Vidhan Sabha constituencies located in Indore district and is part of Indore district which comes under Dhar constituency.

Members of Legislative Assembly

Election results

See also

 Dr. Ambedkar Nagar
 Indore
 Dhar (Lok Sabha constituency)

References

Politics of Indore
Mhow
Assembly constituencies of Madhya Pradesh